Martensia martensi is a species of amphipod crustacean, and the only species in the genus Martensia.

Description
M. martensi is only known from four specimens collected in 1861 in two fjords on the island of Spitsbergen – Kongsfjorden and Isfjorden.

Taxonomy
A. Goës described Lysianassa martensi as a new species in 1866. It was redescribed in 1968, and tentatively assigned to the genus Uristes. In 1991, J. Laurens Barnard and G. S. Karaman erected a new genus, Martensia, for this species alone, and the genus remains monotypic.

References

Gammaridea
Fauna of Svalbard
Crustaceans of the Atlantic Ocean
Crustaceans described in 1866